Carolyn Christov-Bakargiev (born December 2, 1957, in Ridgewood, New Jersey, US) is an Italian-American a curator, museum director and author of numerous essays, catalogs and books on the history of contemporary art. She is currently director of the Castello di Rivoli Museum of Contemporary Art and of the Francesco Federico Cerruti Foundation in Rivoli-Turin, as well as being Visiting Professor at the University of Basel since 2022. In 2019 she received the Audrey Irmas Award for Curatorial Excellence. She was Edith Kreeger Wolf Distinguished Visiting Professor in Art Theory and Practice at Northwestern University (2013-2019) and was a Getty Scholar at the Getty Research Institute.

Named 2012’s most powerful person in the art world by ArtReview’s Power 100 listings, Christov-Bakargiev was Artistic Director of dOCUMENTA (13) which opened in Kassel on June 9, 2012, holding workshops, seminars and exhibitions in Alexandria, Egypt; Kabul, Afghanistan; and Banff, Canada. Her stewardship of dOCUMENTA(13), considered to be one of the most intellectual and significant exhibitions in the art world, renewed one of the exhibition’s primal intentions to enlist culture as an agent of reconstruction, healing and dialogue.

Family and early life
Her mother was from Piedmont, Italy, and her parents studied in Turin together in the mid-1950s. Her father had fled from Bulgaria after World War II and was a medical student in Turin; her mother studied Philosophy in Turin and later got a PhD in archeology. Her parents migrated to the United States in the late 1950s, where she was born.

She grew up partly in Washington, D.C. A dual American-Italian citizen, she returned to Europe after completing her Baccalaureate at a French lycée in Washington, and studied literature, philology, language, and art history  at the University of Pisa, Italy. In 1981, she graduated summa cum laude presenting a thesis on the relationship between American painting and poetry of the 1950s—specifically on Frank O'Hara and his relations with the art of Abstract Expressionism.

Art criticism
After graduation, she moved to Rome and began to write as an art critic for daily newspapers, including Reporter and Il Sole 24 Ore.  Her reporting centered on early 20th century avant-garde and contemporary art. She has written extensively on the Arte Povera movement, such as in her book Arte Povera (Themes and Movements), Phaidon Press, London. She wrote the first monographs on the work of South African artist William Kentridge in 1996/97 (Brussels, Palais des Beaux Arts) and on Canadian artist Janet Cardiff in 2001 (New York, PS1 Contemporary Art Center). She has written books on Adrián Villar Rojas (2019), Hito Steyerl (2019)¸ Nalini Malani (2018), Anna Boghiguian (2017), Giovanni Anselmo (2016), Ed Atkins (2016), Wael Shawky (2016), Franz Kline (2004), Alberto Burri (1996), Fabio Mauri (1994). Her books also include dOCUMENTA(13) the 100 Notes–100 Thoughts series as well as The Book of Books (2011–12).

Career as curator
After working as an independent exhibition curator for many years, and curating summer exhibitions at Villa Medici in Rome, Italy, from 1998 to 2000; she was the Senior Curator at P.S.1 Contemporary Art Center in New York, an affiliate of the Museum of Modern Art. Serving in this position from 1999 to 2001, she initiated the first edition of Greater New York, which was organized with other curators of MoMA PS1. At PS1, she then organized the groundbreaking survey of Janet Cardiff’s work. Following this tenure, she was Chief Curator at the Castello di Rivoli Museum in Turin, Italy, from 2001 to 2008 and Interim Director of the museum in 2009. She has since worked, worldwide, as a curator. Amongst other exhibitions, she was the Artistic Director of the 16th Biennale of Sydney in 2008, entitled Revolutions–Forms that Turn. On December 3, 2008, she was appointed Artistic Director of the thirteenth edition of documenta, dOCUMENTA (13), which took place from 9 June to 16 September 2012, in Kassel, Germany. In 2015, she curated the 14th Istanbul Biennial entitled "SaltWater: a Theory of Thought Forms", which took place in numerous locations spread to the metropolitan area of Istanbul, from 5 September 2015 to 1 November 2015.

Lectures
She has lectured widely at art and educational institutions and Universities for the Arts and Philosophy, including the Jawaharlal Nehru University, New Delhi; Getty Research Institute, Los Angeles; Cornell University, Ithaca; Monash University, Melbourne; Di Tella University, Buenos Aires; Harvard University, Boston; and MIT, Boston. In 2018, she was Lead Professor of the program Shanghai Curators Lab at Shanghai Academy of Fine Art, Shanghai. In 2014, she received the Leverhulme Professorship from the University of Leeds. In 2013, she was also the Menschel Visiting Professor in Art at The Cooper Union, New York as well as the Pernod Ricard Visiting Professor in the philosophy of art and naturecultures at the Goethe-Universität Frankfurt am Main / Institut für Philosophie. In 2015 she was Getty Visiting Scholar.

Selected publications
Willie Doherty. In the dark, projected works, Kunsthalle Bern, 1996, 
William Kentridge, Palais des Beaux-Arts, Brüssel, 1998, 
Arte Povera (Themes and Movements), Phaidon Press, London, 1998, 
Janet Cardiff, a survey of works (including collaborations with George Bures Miller), P.S. 1 Contemporary Art Center, Long Island City, 2001, 
The Moderns, Skira, Milan, 2003, 
Pierre Huyghe, Skira, Milan, 2004, 
with David Anfam: Franz Kline (1910–1962), Skira, Milan, 2004, 
Faces in the Crowd. Picturing Modern Life from Manet to Today, Castello di Rivoli Museo d'Arte Contemporanea, Skira, Milan, Whitechapel Gallery, Castello di Rivoli Museo d'Arte Contemporanea, 2004, 
Franz Kline, Castello di Rivoli Museo d'Arte Contemporanea, Skira, Milan, Castello di Rivoli Museo d'Arte Contemporanea, 2004 
Revolutions – Forms That Turn, Biennale of Sydney, Thames and Hudson, 2008 
Thomas Ruff, Castello di Rivoli Museo d'Arte Contemporanea, Skira, Milan, Castello di Rivoli Museo d'Arte Contemporanea, 2009 
Documenta 13: Catalog I/3, II/3, III/3, The Book of Books, Kassel, Hatje Cantz, 2012, 
Arte Povera: Radical Uses Of Materials, Processes, And Situations, in Stedelijk Collection Reflections: Reflections on the Collection of the Stedelijk Museum Amsterdam, Stedelijk Museum, nai010 Publishers, 2013
14th Istanbul Biennial Saltwater Catalogue, Istanbul, IKSV Yayinlari, 2015, 
Hito Steyerl The city of Broken Windows, Castello di Rivoli Museo d'Arte Contemporanea, Skira, Milan, Castello di Rivoli Museo d'Arte Contemporanea, 2019, 
Foreword, in Carolee Thea, On Curating II, D.A.P. Publications, New York, 2019

References

External links
dOCUMENTA (13) Exhibition, Kassel
The New York Times 'A Powerful Curator’s Idiosyncratic Genius

1957 births
Living people
People from Ridgewood, New Jersey
American people of Bulgarian descent
American people of Italian descent
Italian women writers
Italian writers
Italian art curators
American art curators
American women curators
American women writers
Directors of museums in Italy
Women museum directors
21st-century American women